The Chief of Defence Logistics (FlogC) is a senior position within the Swedish Armed Forces, responsible for all logistical requirement of the Armed Forces. The post was created in 2005.

History
In 2005, a position of Inspector of Logistics (LogI) was established at the Swedish Armed Forces Headquarters at the same level as the other inspectors. The first inspector was Major General Åke Jansson, who prior to that was commander of the Swedish Armed Forces Logistics (FMLOG). LogI was then responsible for the units Göta Logistic Regiment (T 2), Swedish Armed Forces Logistics (FMLOG), Swedish Armed Forces Technical School (Försvarsmaktens tekniska skola, FMTS), National CBRN Defence Centre (SkyddC) and the Medical Center of the Swedish Armed Forces (FSC).

At the beginning of 2014, inspectors and military commanders transferred to the Training & Procurement Staff (PROD) from INSATS and the Chief Information Officer (CIO) was transferred to PROD. The Logistics Department (PROD LOG) and the Procurement Department (PROD MTRL) was organized into two departments under a joint Chief of Logistics. In 2014, the post changed its name from Chief of Logistics (LogC) to Chief of Defence Logistics (FlogC). Prior to 2017, the Chief of Defence Logistics was also head of the materiel side. In 2017, a division took place in such a way that there is a Chief of Defence Logistics and a Chief of Procurement, who has his own connection to the Defence Materiel Administration.

Role
The Swedish Armed Forces Logistics (FMLOG), the Swedish Armed Forces Technical School (Försvarsmaktens tekniska skola, FMTS), the Swedish Armed Forces Centre for Defence Medicine (FömedC) are subordinate to the Chief of Defence Logistics. The Chief of Defence Logistics with the Logistics Department (PROD LOG) has production responsibility for these units but does not have the task of tactically commanding its subordinate units.

The Chief of Defence Logistics together with the Chief of Army, Chief of Navy and the Chief of Air Force as well as the Chief of Management System (Ledningssystemchefen, LSC), Assistant Chief of Armed Forces Training & Procurement, (Resursproduktionschefen, C PROD RPE) and the Chief of Home Guard are subordinate to the Chief of Armed Forces Training & Procurement.

Chiefs

|-style="text-align:center;"
!colspan=9|Inspector of Logistics (Logistikinspektör, LogI)

|-style="text-align:center;"
!colspan=9|Chief of Logistics (Logistikchef, LogC)

|-style="text-align:center;"
!colspan=9|Chief of Defence Logistics (Försvarslogistikchef, FlogC)

Deputy Chiefs

Footnotes

References

Military appointments of Sweden
Military logistics of Sweden